The term Kamba War has been used by historians to refer to a conflict that took place between the Kamba people and communities living in regions around present day Bagamoyo, Tanzania. It has been argued that the Kamba attack forced the communities living in this area to unite against the enemy and that this unification led to the creation of Zaramo identity. The Zaramo are presently the largest ethnic group in the regions surrounding Dar es Salaam in Tanzania.

Overview
Zaramo traditions state that these Swahili communities later known as Zaramo were led by a group of Shirazi rulers called Shomvi or Shomwi at the time they were attacked by the Kamba people of Kenya. Other accounts indicate that it was these communities that were known as Shomvi. The Shomvi sought the assistance of a leader known as Pazi Kilama Lukali or Pazi Kibwe Banduka who came to their aid. Subsequently, the Shomvi agreed to offer the Pazi an annual tribute as ongoing payment for his assistance.

Periodization
Fabian (2019) states that the "Zaramo played (a role) in assisting the Shomvi at the dawn of the nineteenth century when a society from the north, the Kamba, invaded the region..."

Shomvi appeal to Pazi
Fabian (2019) states that according to one account;

Outcome
According to Zaramo traditions, the Kamba were routed with the assistance of Pazi Kilama and the Shomvi returned to the coast. In exchange for Lukali's assistance, they agreed to pay Lukali an annual tribute known as kanda la pazi, this was paid in the form of cloth and salt.

References

Kamba
Conflicts in Africa
History of Tanzania